Brazilian comics (known in Brazilian Portuguese as HQs, gibis, revistinhas, historietas, quadrinhos or tirinhas) started in the 19th century, adopting a satirical style known as cartoon, charges or caricature that would later be cemented in the popular comic strips. The publication of magazines dedicated exclusively to comics, in Brazil, started at the beginning of the 20th century. Brazilian artists have worked with both styles. In the case of American comics some have achieved international fame, like Roger Cruz with X-Men and Mike Deodato with Thor, Wonder Woman and others.

History

Precursors and initial steps (1837–1895) 

Brazilian comics have a long history, that goes back to the 19th century. As a charge, the first drawing was circulated in 1837, sold in separate like a lithography, by Manuel de Araújo Porto-alegre. This author would latter create a magazine of political humor in 1844.

In the late of the 1860s, Angelo Agostini continued the tradition of introducing the Brazilian journalistic and popular publications, drawings with themes of political and social satire. Between his most popular characters, drawn as protagonists of stories in comics, were Nho Quim (1869) and Zé Caipora (1883). Agostini published in magazines like Vida Fluminense, O Malho, and Don Quixote.

O Tico-Tico 
Released on October 11, 1905, the magazine O Tico-Tico is considered the first comic book in the country. Designed by the cartoonist Renato de Castro, the project was presented to Luís Bartolomeu de Souza e Silva, the owner of the magazine O Malho (where Angelo Agostini worked after the cancellation of Don Quixote). After being approved, the magazine was attended by Angelo Agostini, who created the logo and some stories. The format was inspired by the French children's magazine La Semaine de Suzette, which had some of its characters adapted to a Brazilian version. The magazine had the collaboration of renowned artists such as J. Carlos (responsible for the graphic changes in 1922), Max Yantok, and Alfredo Storni.

The most successful character in the magazine was Chiquinho (published between 1905 and 1958), considered for many years an original Brazilian creation (however, in recent publications the character has been accused of being a rip-off of the American character Buster Brown). Other characters who starred in the magazine were Reco-Reco, Bolão e Azeitona by Luiz Sá, Lamparina by J. Carlos, Kaximbown by Max Yantok, Max Muller by A. Rocha, and others.

In the 1930s, some American strips and characters, such as Mickey Mouse, Krazy Kat, and Felix the Cat, were published in the magazine. J. Carlos was the first Brazilian artist to draw characters from the Walt Disney Company in the pages of Tico-Tico.

The magazine lost popularity in the 1930s when new comic books and newspaper comic strips were released in Brazil. The magazine ended in 1957, with some republications until 1977.

Supplements and the creation of the Publishers 
In September 1929, the newspaper A Gazeta creates a comic supplement in tabloid format, based on the Sunday supplements of the American comics; in the following month, Casa Editorial Vecchi (an Italian origin publisher) published the magazine: Mundo Infantil, but the success of the supplements was given in 1934 with the creation of the magazine Suplemento Infantil (later renamed as Suplemento Juvenil) by Adolfo Aizen. Aizen was known to work in the newspaper O Globo, and also in magazines O Malho and O Tico-Tico. His project was loosely inspired by American comics, he formed partnerships to publish the stories with characters like Flash Gordon, Mandrake the Magician, Donald Duck, Popeye, along original characters created by Brazilian artists as As Aventuras de Roberto Sorocaba.

With the success of the magazine other magazine supplements were created in the following years, among them the one that earned popularity was O Globo Juvenil, created by Roberto Marinho to compete against the Suplemento Juvenil. O Globo Juvenil was responsible for introducing characters such as Superman, The Phantom, Prince Valiant, Li'l Abner, Alley Oop, and the republication of some titles from Suplemento Juvenil.

In 1937, a new character was created through the newspaper supplements called A Garra Cinzenta, created by Francisco Armond and Renato Silva. The character has become known for its mature themes involving mystery, horror and science fiction. The comics ended in 1939 totaling 100 pages, and was later republished in the Franco-Belgian market.

Titles
Combo Rangers
Geraldão
Holy Avenger
O Menino Maluquinho
Níquel Náusea
Senninha
Sítio do Picapau Amarelo
Turma do Pererê
Turma da Mônica

References